"Super Bass" is a song by rapper Nicki Minaj from the deluxe version of her debut studio album, Pink Friday (2010). It was sent to American rhythmic radio stations as the album's fifth single on April 5, 2011. The song was co-written by Minaj, along with Ester Dean, Roahn Hylton, and Kane Beatz, who also produced the song along with JMIKE. According to Minaj, the song's lyrics detail the story of a playful romance between a man and a woman. The bubblegum pop and pop rap song contains electronic influences, while Minaj raps over a hip hop beat. An accompanying music video for the single was shot in March 2011 by director Sanaa Hamri and shows Minaj playfully taunting a group of men; while making use of multiple props colored bubblegum pink.

"Super Bass" received positive reviews from music critics upon release. It later appeared in Billboard's "100 Songs That Defined the Decade" list and Rolling Stone's "500 Best Songs of All Time" 2021 list at 426. Billboard named the song the 7th Greatest Karaoke song of all time. The song peaked at number three on the US Billboard Hot 100 and in New Zealand, as well as number six in Australia and Canada. It also reached number eight on the UK Singles Chart. In the United States, it has sold over five million digital downloads as of December 2014. In November 2021, "Super Bass" was certified Diamond by the Recording Industry Association of America (RIAA), for selling 10 million equivalent units in the US.

Composition

"Super Bass" was co-written by Minaj, Ester Dean, Roahn Hylton, and Daniel "Kane Beatz" Johnson, who produced the song alongside JMIKE. While being interviewed by MTV News during the video shoot for the single, Minaj explained the song's concept, stating: "'Super Bass' is about the boy that you are crushing over, [...] And you kind of want to get your mack on, but you're taking the playful approach." The song utilizes electronic music and pop in its composition, while Minaj raps over a hip hop drum beat, while also infusing elements of J-pop combined with an upbeat hook.  It uses a busy beat that is interspersed with digital rain drop sound effects and strong bass. Minaj's vocals in the song have been described as "breathy". "Super Bass" is written in the key of G-sharp minor with a moderate tempo of 128 beats per minute. Minaj's lyrics in the song are often provocative and suggestive, with lines like "He just gotta give me that look, when he give me that look / Then the panties comin' off, off, uh" and a catchy onomatopoetic refrain: "Boom, badoom, boom, boom, badoom, boom, bass, he got dat super bass".

Brad Wete of Entertainment Weekly stated that the song describes Minaj's type of man as "one who hits the gym often and has first-class... money" as she states: "He pops bottles and he’s got the right kind of build.... He’s always in the air / But he never flies coach". Charley Rogulewski of AOL's The Boombox stated that "the uber-catchy 'boom, badoom, boom, boom' chorus makes 'Super Bass' the most pop-friendly Minaj song released to radio [sic] yet". Described as a lighter side to Minaj by Jessica Sinclair of Long Island Press, the song gets more in-depth with a little more pop and an upbeat hook that "really sticks"; however, Minaj still assists the song's pop edge with "crazy rapping skills".

Critical reception
Wesley Case of The Baltimore Sun gave the song a positive review, stating that it was an "obvious hit". He compared the song to the rest of Pink Friday, stating that it is much more potent as compared to the rest of the album. Case later added: "Pink Friday is short on memorable hooks, but 'Super Bass' is an exception". Rap-Up described the tune as "infectious". Jessica Sinclair of Long Island Press complimented Nicki Minaj for taking "center stage" on the song, due to her solo performance, and added that in doing so Minaj created a success. Sinclair additionally commented on the song as a lighter side to Minaj, and complimented the hook as upbeat and added that it "really sticks". Rosie Gray of BlackBook complimented the song as a "killer". Alex Pielak of Metro compared Minaj's "Super Bass" to Beyoncé's "Move Your Body", stating that: "Nicki wins for the sheer number of words she's managed to cram in – and therefore takes the face off".

Lewis Corner from Digital Spy gave the single four out of a possible five stars. Corner wrote that the song's chorus was "sharper than a Sherbet Dib Dab." Minaj's "eccentric rapping style" was praised in the review with Corner writing that the song was likely to become her first solo top ten hit in the United States or the United Kingdom. Claire Suddath of Time magazine named "Super Bass" one of the Top 10 Songs of 2011. As of January 2015, Billboard listed the song as one of "The 20 Best Songs of 2010s (So Far)".

Billboard writer, Tatiana Cirisano, stated that in 2011, Minaj was "one of the few mainstream female rappers ... thanks to her ability to bridging audience boundaries with genre-blending hits," which "established her as a pop superstar", and the song "both shaped and reflected the music and culture" of the mentioned year.

In 2022, Billboard named it the 7th Greatest  karaoke song of all time.

Accolades

Commercial performance
On the week of May 14, 2011, "Super Bass" debuted on the US Billboard Hot 100 at position 98. The following week it rose 50 spots to number 48. On the week titled May 21, 2011, "Super Bass" debuted on the Hot Rap Songs and Hot Digital Songs charts at number 25 and 31 respectively. In its 14th week, the song reached a new peak at number three on the Hot 100, while also having longevity on the charts for 39 weeks until 2012; 38 of which were in the top 50. In Canada, "Super Bass" debuted on the Canadian Hot 100 at number 92. It was the highest-charting female rap song since "Work It" by Missy Elliott in 2002. "Super Bass" entered the UK Singles Chart at number 46 on May 21, 2011, and after nine non-consecutive weeks of moving up the chart, reached a peak of number eight on the chart for the week ending August 13, 2011. In December 2013, "Super Bass" was certified 8× platinum by the Recording Industry Association of America (RIAA). As of December 2014, the song has sold 5 million pure sales in the United States. As of November 2021, the song has sold 10 million equivalent units in the United States and has been certified diamond.

Music video

Background

On March 10, 2011, Minaj revealed during an interview with MTV News that she was shooting a video for "Super Bass" with director Sanaa Hamri and producers: Kimberly S. Stuckwisch, Michelle Larkin & Keith "KB" Brown. She explained the video's concept, stating that she wanted the video to be full of eye candy and that she wanted it to be colorful. On April 26, 2011, Minaj premiered a sneak peek of the music video on BET's 106 & Park. The preview showed Minaj in a pink wig with similarly-clad backup dancers gyrating to the song, wearing a uniform of white tank tops, denim short shorts, different colored bras, and different colored work boots and the same laces.

Originally the video was set to premiere on the same show as where the preview was premiered on April 27, 2011, but instead was postponed. Minaj took to Twitter to explain that the music video has been pulled from the show and would not be premiering that date for unknown reasons. The music video instead premiered on Minaj's official Vevo account on May 5, 2011.

Synopsis

The music video begins with a close-up of Minaj as she opens her eyes and begins to blink as the song begins. As Minaj raps verses of the song, Barbie- approved props; a pink Ferrari, pink plane and a pink pool, are shown contemplating what Minaj is saying in the verse. Minaj then begins to playfully tease men as clips of ice-speakers and a motorcycle made of ice are interlaced into the scene. As the chorus begins, Minaj is seen performing choreography with five clones of herself. As the video continues, Minaj is seen in a green wig at a pool side with several well-built men, and then splashing with a man in the pool of pink water. Minaj then continues to ride the motorcycle made of ice while wearing a skintight pink bodysuit emblazoned with giraffe prints, a half-blond and pink wig, gold eye shadow and bright pink lipstick. Minaj then begins to reprise her lap dances in the dark, with black lights setting the glowing tone of the dancers, as Minaj glows in the dark with glowing lips, hair and makeup. She and her dancers play in feathers that are also glow in the dark towards the end of the video. The video closes with Safaree S.B. Samuels dancing beside her, and Minaj lit in the black lighting, biting her finger while laying across the lap of a male she gave a lapdance to in the video.

Critical reception and accolades
D.L. Chandler from Rapfix complimented the video's visuals writing, "it is a dazzling visual affair if nothing else". AOL music's Contessa Gayles reviewed the video, writing, "The highlight of the Sanaa Hamri-directed video? The glow-in-the-dark lap-dance scene." On the day of its premiere, Rap-Up complimented the video as "vibrant". Becky Bain of Idolator gave the song a positive review, comparing it to "Judas" stating, "Super Bass had the better choreography in an anxiously-awaited music video featuring a pop star riding a motorcycle released today. (Sorry, 'Judas')". United Kingdom's MTV found Minaj's signature lap dance "saucy" and complimented the clip's use of "hunky men" and "outrageous flirting". Brad Wete of Entertainment Weekly stated that there is plenty of "eye candy" for both men and women, stating that Minaj "ratchets up the sex appeal" in the clip. Wesley Case of The Baltimore Sun complimented the video as wildly stylized that "looks like a comic book come to life".
At the 2011 MTV Video Music Awards, Minaj's video for "Super Bass" was nominated under the Best Female Video and Best Hip-Hop Video categories, winning the latter and gaining Minaj her first moonman.

Live performances
"Super Bass" was performed live for the first time during the 2011 Billboard Music Awards on May 22, 2011. Minaj performed the song alongside David Guetta at the American Music Awards of 2011 on November 20, 2011, and also performed Guetta's song "Turn Me On", which Minaj was featured on.  Minaj also performed the song on Dick Clark's New Year's Rockin' Eve with Ryan Seacrest and on the 2011 Victoria's Secret Fashion Show which aired on November 29, 2011 on CBS. The song was the encore song on Minaj's debut concert tour, the Pink Friday Tour. She also has performed the song on her Pink Friday: Reloaded Tour, The Pinkprint Tour and on The Nicki Wrld Tour.

Minaj performed "Super Bass" at the 2014 MTV Europe Music Awards followed by "Bed of Lies" with Skylar Grey and "Anaconda". On May 30, 2015, Minaj also performed the song on the iHeartRadio Summer Pool Party 2015 in Las Vegas.

Cover versions
"Super Bass" was covered by several artists and celebrities such as Taylor Swift, Selena Gomez, Kendall Jenner and Sophia Grace & Rosie who performed with Minaj on The Ellen DeGeneres Show after going viral on YouTube. MTV writer, Rob Markman, stated that "more than its chart positioning was the song's impact" citing various covers and renditions.

Awards and nominations

Track listing
Digital download
"Super Bass" – 3:19

US CD single
"Super Bass" – 3:21
"Moment 4 Life" – 4:39

UK Promo CD single
"Super Bass" – 3:21

Credits and personnel
Credits adapted from the liner notes of Pink Friday.

Lead vocals & Songwriting – Nicki Minaj
Songwriting – Ester Dean, Daniel Johnson
Production – Kane

Recording – Ariel Chobaz
Recording assistant – Lyttleton "Cartwheel" Carter

Charts

Weekly charts

Year-end charts

Decade-end charts

Certifications

Radio and release history

References

Nicki Minaj songs
2010 songs
2011 singles
Cash Money Records singles
Universal Motown Records singles
Young Money Entertainment singles
Music videos directed by Sanaa Hamri
Song recordings produced by Kane Beatz
Songs written by Nicki Minaj
Songs written by Ester Dean
Songs written by Kane Beatz